Garage Sale Mystery is an American/Canadian mystery film series starring Lori Loughlin as Jennifer Shannon. It is based on the Garage Sale Mystery book series written by Suzi Weinert.  The Hallmark series aired on Hallmark Movies & Mysteries in the US, Bravo in Canada and Channel 5 in the UK occasionally as part of the weekday films. Fifteen films aired from the 2013 pilot film, until the series was cancelled in 2019 after Loughlin was fired from Hallmark.

The author of the book series, Suzi Weinert, created the story and characters based on her experiences living in the DC suburbs, where she attended sales given by politicians, CEO’s, diplomats, military elite, and other influential homeowners in this upscale, transient area. She discovered that valuable merchandise often came with unexpected stories, leading to her Garage Sale mystery series. Her books span ripped-from-the-headlines topics like terrorism and elder care.  The wife of a retired Army general, Weinert lives in northern Virginia near most of her five children and their growing families. Weinert is a member of Mystery Writers of America and Sisters in Crime.

The Hallmark series based on Weinert's work was executive produced by Loughlin, Michael Shepard, and Peter DeLuise, who are also executive producers on the Hallmark television series When Calls the Heart. The series followed the story of an antique dealer, Jennifer Shannon, who had a knack for finding murders. Her eye for details leads her to help solve these murders, even if it means, putting her life in danger. Weinert made a cameo in the first Hallmark Garage Sale Mystery.

Cast
Lori Loughlin as Jennifer Shannon, series protagonist who runs an antiques shop called Rags to Riches
Steve Bacic as Jason Shannon, Jennifer's engineer husband (Rick Ravanello played the role in the first film)
Sarah Strange as Danielle/"Dani", Jennifer's business partner and co-owner of Rags to Riches
Eva Bourne as Hannah Shannon, Jennifer and Jason's daughter (Sara Canning played the role in the first film)
Connor Stanhope as Logan Shannon, Jennifer and Jason's son (Played by Brendan Meyer in the first four films)
Kevin O'Grady as Detective Frank Lynwood, a friend of Jennifer

Characters

 A dark grey cell indicates the character was not in the film.

Films

Background
The series started as an adaptation of the novel Garage Sale Stalker by Suzi Weinert, although the screenplay for the first, and subsequent films, differs substantially from the novel and its sequels. The series were influenced by Agatha Christie, with several references to the famous mystery author.

Broadcast
The first film in the series premiered in the USA on the Hallmark Channel, with subsequent films premiering on the Hallmark Movies & Mysteries Channel.

In Canada, the films air on Bravo. In the UK, they have been broadcast on Channel 5 and in South Africa on eMovies HD.

Cancellation
The series was cancelled after Hallmark Movies & Mysteries parent company Crown Media Holdings said that Loughlin would have no further involvement in any Crown Media projects. On March 14, 2019, Loughlin was terminated from Hallmark due to her involvement and indictment in the 2019 college admissions bribery scandal. At the time of Loughlin's arrest, the 16th film in the series, Search & Seized, was completed and the 17th, Three Little Murders, was in production, with one week of filming left.

References

External links

Hallmark Channel original programming
Hallmark Channel original films
American film series
American mystery films
Canadian film series
Canadian mystery films
Canadian television films
Films based on American novels
Films shot in British Columbia